Killian's dehiscence (also known as Killian's triangle) is a triangular area in the wall of the pharynx between the cricopharyngeus and thyropharyngeus which are the two parts of the inferior constrictors(also see Pharyngeal pouch). It can be seen as a locus minoris resistentiae.
Similar triangular area between circular fibres of cricopharyngeus and longitudinal fibres of esophagus is Lamier's triangle or Lamier-hackermann's area.

Clinical significance
It represents a potentially weak spot where a pharyngoesophageal diverticulum (Zenker's diverticulum) is more likely to occur.

Eponym
It is named after the German ENT surgeon Gustav Killian.

References

Human head and neck
Otorhinolaryngology